The 1914–15 team finished with a record of 9–4. It was the 1st and only year for head coach Thomas Ransom. The team captain was Elton Rynearson.

Schedule

|-
!colspan=9 style="background:#006633; color:#FFFFFF;"| Non-conference regular season

1. EMU list score as 26-14 and CMU list score as 46-18.

References

Eastern Michigan Eagles men's basketball seasons
Michigan State Normal